Gold Town (on topographic maps) or OarVille is a former settlement in Kern County, California.
 
Today, Goldtown exists only as a grid of dirt roads and a few abandoned buildings and mines in the desert off the California State Route 14. Silver Queen Road is the main paved road that connects Goldtown to the California State Route 14.

Fleta, California is 0.62 miles northeast of Goldtown. Mojave, California is 1.44 miles to the north. Gold mines exist within 2 miles to the north and south of Goldtown. These mines include: the Golden Queen Mine and Elephant Eagle mine on Soledad Mountain south of Goldtown , and Whitmore Mine and Exposed Treasure mine on Standard Hill north of Goldtown. The California Aqueduct Road is located about 5 miles to the west of Goldtown.

Golden Queen Mine
From the early 1900s to 1980s, the Golden Queen Mine  was active on and off, using open pit, underground works, and heap leaching. About +100,000 tons of tailings were created over the years. Due to erosion since, some of these tailings reached the alluvial fan surface. The tailings contain elevated levels of arsenic. "Significant potential human health risks to the community and regional environmental impacts may have resulted from release of arsenic-bearing tailings into the waters of the state and airborne sources." according to the Bureau of Land Management.

Construction has begun to re-open the Golden Queen Mine. Commissioning is planned for 2015. This is part of the Soledad Mountain Project. Open pit mining, cyanide heap leaching, and Merrill-Crowe processes will be used to recover gold and silver from crushed, agglomerated ore. The heap leach pad for the mine will be located near Goldtown, according to Kern County Planning and Community Development Department.

References

External links
goldenqueen.com

Former settlements in Kern County, California
Mining communities in California
Mojave, California
Populated places in the Mojave Desert